Abelardo Rodríguez Urdaneta (June 24, 1870 – January 11, 1933) was a Dominican sculptor, photographer, painter and educator. A prolific artist, he was one of the first successful multidisciplinary artists of the modern art era in the Dominican Republic and considered to be one of the forerunners of Dominican sculpture, photography, and painting.  His creative work consists of a large number of portraits, busts, statues, monuments and pictorial paintings in which he collected important moments in the country’s history that reflected the lives of social leaders, merchants, and families of the time.

In 1908, Urdaneta opened an academy of drawing, painting and sculpture that trained many prominent artists, including Celeste Woss y Gil, Delia Weber, Genoveva Báez, Aida Ibarra and Fernando 'Tuto' Báez.  He kept his academy active until 1933, the year of his death.

At present, many of his works are conserved in the Museum of Modern Art and Museo Bellapart in Santo Domingo. In the Autonomous University of Santo Domingo, his statue, "Caonabo,” stands. Two reproductions made in Italy of this work are in the Mirador Park and in Santiago.  One of the streets in the Gascue neighborhood bears his name and the house where he was born became a museum that preserves archives, photos, paintings, and chronicles. In honor of his work, the Rodríguez Urdaneta Photography Contest, created in April 1981, and the Abelardo Rodríguez Urdaneta FUNGLODE Photography Contest, created in 2007, are named after him.

Biography
Urdaneta was born in Santo Domingo in June 24, 1870, to parents Isabel Rodríguez Urdaneta, of Venezuelan descent, and doctor Manuel Guerrero Peña, who had a fondness for the violin and painting. He had two sisters, Eloísa and Rosalía. At the age of 13, he was enrolled in the workshop of Juan Fernández Corridor, a Spanish painter who opened an academy in Santo Domingo from 1883 to 1886. Later he enrolled under the tutelage of Dominican painter Luis Desangles, considered one of the first master painters of the country, later participating in the First National Art Show (1890), in which he exhibited together with his teachers and with fellow disciples Arturo Grullón, Leopoldo Navarro, and among others. He later learned the artistic fundamentals of photography as a pupil of Julio Pou, a Dominican photographer, and Spaniard Francisco Adrover. In 1894 he began working as a freelance professional photographer, shortly becoming one of the most socially demanded national photographers of the time. 

Urdaneta married Graciela Núñez, with whom he had 5 children: Elena, Rafael, Abelardito, José Angel, and a child who died very young. His reputation as a handsome artistic gentleman led to extramarital love affairs that resulted in even more descendants. He became despressed following the loss of artistic works caused by hurricane San Zenón (1930). On his deathbed, next to him was only the Aragonese Esther Laclaustro Dorse, his last lover, who lived with him for 25 years (1908-1933), since almost all of his children lived abroad, as well as Graciela Núñez, the official widow who died in New York in 1939.

Artistic Career
Urdaneta was known as one of the preeminent photographers of the country, going on to photograph many influential socialites of the time. In 1898, his photo of Arturo Pellerano Alfau was published, considered to be the first photograph published in a Dominican magazine. Since 1901, his photographic studio came to be somewhat of a cultural center in Santo Domingo, visited by many prominent personalities, from politicians to artists including José Martí, Eugenio de Hostos, and Delia Weber. 

In 1890, Abelardo completed his oil portrait of Juan Pablo Duarte. The image, inspired in great part by the earlier works of Alejandro Bonilla (1820-1901), is today the most recognized and admired reproduction of the founding father. In general, Urdaneta’s portrait and pictorial paintings are of the romantic and neoclassicist style.

Furthermore, Urdaneta is considered to be the father of modern Dominican sculpture. In 1903 he created his most celebrated sculpture, "One of many", of a wounded soldier, left on the ground, with torn clothes and bare chest, for which he obtained the most recognition in the Republic and the world. In 2009 this sculpture was removed due to remodeling of the Galicia Park. His other most famous sculpture is "Caonabo", of the Taino rebel that evoke the Spanish injustices against the indigenous peoples of the island. 

In 1908 with support from the central government of Ramón Cáceres, he opened an academy of drawing, painting and sculpture that trained many future artists. He taught there until his death.

Politics
Urdaneta was a vocal opponent of the First U.S. Occupation from 1916 - 1924. His "Invocación" poster in which Dominican Republic is represented as a female figure with arms raised and hands held by the claws of an eagle, became widely circulated throughout the country.

Selected works

El Extraviado
Los Jugadores
Juramento de Duarte
Cupido
Pedazo de costa
Recuerdos del Sur,
El Menphis,
El Castini
A la mar
Paisaje del crepúsculo
Barcas
Abnegación
La libertad de Cuba
(El asesinato del Presidente Ramón Cáceres
Horacio Vásquez
Escudo Constitucional Dominicano
La figura de Juan Pablo Duarte
La Libertad
La Independencia
Invocación
Cabeza de indio Siboney
Los náufragos del tres de Septiembre
El último Tributo

Gallery

References

1870 births
1933 deaths
People from Santo Domingo
19th-century Dominican Republic artists
20th-century Dominican Republic artists
20th-century Dominican Republic painters
Dominican Republic male artists
Male painters
20th-century male artists
Dominican Republic sculptors
19th-century sculptors
20th-century sculptors
20th-century photographers
19th-century photographers
Art educators
White Dominicans